Unicornio  (Unicorn), is the fifth album by Cuban musician Silvio Rodríguez, released in 1982.

Track listing

Personnel
Performing 
 Piano and keyboards – José María Vitier, Frank Fernández, Hilario Durán Torres
 Bass – Jorge Reyes Hernández
 Drum kit – Bernardo García Carrera
 Rhythm – Reinaldo Valera del Monte, Francisco Amat, Héctor Arcos Huergo
 Guitar – Ahmed Barroso Jorajuría, Osear A. Hernández Rodríguez
 Flute – José L. Cortés González
 Oboe – Antonio Sánchez Hernández
 Clarinet – Rafael Inciarte Rodríguez
 Bassoon – Héctor Manresa Gómez
 French horn – Moisés Hernández Doménico, Francisco Santiago Novo, Darío Morgan González
 Trumpet – Armando Galán Alfonso, Andrés Castro
 Trombone – Antonio Leal Rodríguez, Demetrio Muniz Lavalle
 Violin – Lino Alemán Arvelo, Jesús Ordóñez Enríquez, Norberto Rodríguez de Castro, Humberto Benítez Sarduy, Pablo Mesa Suárez, José Ferrer Sosa, Luis Barrera Fernández, Nydia Mieses López, Ana Martínez de la Junquera, Taras Domitrov García, Pedro Cartas Martín, Juan Corrales Subida, Andrés Collazo Rodríguez, Frank Arias Ramírez, Martha Duarte Mustelier, Rafael Machado Ruiz, Daqoberto González Hernández, Lázaro González Sibone, Rosa M. Estrada Nogueiras, Armando Toledo Cisneros, Heriberto Fonseca Ribesco, Guillermo Gutiérrez Consuegra
 Viola – Mará L. Juan Carvajal, Rafael Cutiño, Roberto Herrera Díaz, Alina Neira Betancourt, José M. Fernández Rosado
 Cello – Roberto Rodríguez Gómez, Juan Elósegui Pérez, Víctor M. Puentes Fiffe, Osvaldo Cañi zares Cabrera, Jorge S. Suárez Trueba, Miguel Reina de la Torre, Alberto Alen Pérez, Rodolfo Navarro Fernández
 Double Bass – Iván Valiente Valdés
 Trío – Isidro Pérez Pérez, Osear A. Hernández Rodríguez, Waldo Domínguez Santiago.

References 

1982 albums
Silvio Rodríguez albums